Samuel E. Shaw (May 7, 1863 - February 13, 1947) was an American professional baseball player who played parts of two seasons for the Baltimore Orioles of the American Association and the Chicago Colts of the National League. He was born in Baltimore, Maryland the date and place of his death is unknown.

External links

1864 births
1947 deaths
19th-century baseball players
Major League Baseball pitchers
Baseball players from Baltimore
Baltimore Orioles (AA) players
Chicago Colts players
Jersey City Skeeters players
Worcester Grays players
Quincy Black Birds players
Burlington Babies players
Terre Haute (minor league baseball) players
Baltimore Orioles (Atlantic Association) players
Terre Haute Hottentots players
Rochester Hop Bitters players
Augusta Electricians players
Lynchburg Hill Climbers players
Nashville Tigers players
Toronto Canucks players
Lancaster Maroons players